Shachar Kariv is an economist and the Benjamin N. Ward professor of economics and economics department chair at the University of California, Berkeley. He also teaches at the Norwegian School of Economics.

Kariv is an editor of the Review of Economics and Statistics.

Kariv was the chair of the economics department of the University of California, Berkeley from 2014 to 2017 and since 2021 has been chair once more.

References

Living people
American economists
UC Berkeley College of Engineering faculty
Academic staff of the Norwegian School of Economics
Tel Aviv University alumni
New York University alumni
Year of birth missing (living people)